A general election was held in the U.S. state of Louisiana on November 3, 2020. To vote by mail, registered Louisiana voters must request a ballot by October 30, 2020.

State offices

Louisiana Public Service Commission
2 seats in the Louisiana Public Service Commission were up for election for a 6-year term.

District 1

District 5
Since a candidate won more than half of the votes in the primary, no general runoff was held.

Louisiana House of Representatives (special)
A special election was held for District 54 of the Louisiana House of Representatives due to the death of incumbent Reggie Bagala.

Louisiana Supreme Court
Two seats in the Louisiana Supreme Court were up for election.

District 4
A special election was held for District 4 due to the retirement of incumbent Justice Marcus R. Clark.

District 7
On November 6, 2020, Terri Love withdrew from the race. Therefore, no general run-off was held.

Federal offices

President and vice president of the United States

Louisiana had 8 electoral votes in the Electoral College. Republican Donald Trump won all of them with 58% of the popular vote.

U.S. House of Representatives

All of Louisiana's 6 representatives in the United States House of Representatives were up for election. Republicans won 5 seats while Democrats won 1 seat. No seats changed hands.

U.S. Senate

Republican Bill Cassidy was re-elected.

Ballot measures

Amendment 1 (November) 
Louisiana Amendment 1, the No Right to Abortion in Constitution Amendment of 2020, passed with a yes vote of 62.06%. It explicitly adds language that denies a person's right to abortion. It adds the following language to the state constitution:

Amendment 2

Amendment 3

Amendment 4

Amendment 5

Amendment 6

Amendment 7

Amendment 1 (December)

See also
 Elections in Louisiana
 Politics of Louisiana
 Political party strength in Louisiana

References

External links
  (State affiliate of the U.S. League of Women Voters)
 
 
 
 

 
Louisiana